Midlakes (also, Midlake and Blue Lakes) is a settlement in Lake County, California.

Location

The town lies between Blue Lake and Lower Blue Lake in the Blue Lakes chain.
The Midlake Post Office operated from 1900 to 1945.

Midlake falls into Division #9, which is the Pacific Division, and Census #4, which is the West Region.

External links
 Souvenir photo album of Blue Lakes (ca. 1895), The Bancroft Library

References

Former settlements in Lake County, California
Former populated places in California